

First Army

General Petar Bojović, Commanding First Army

Colonel Božidar Terzić, Chief of Staff

Second Army 

General Stepa Stepanović, Commanding Second Army

Colonel Vojislav Živanović, Chief of Staff

Third army 

General Pavle Jurišić Šturm, Commanding Third Army

Colonel Dušan Pešić, Chief of Staff

Army group Užice 

General Miloš Božanović

References

Sources
 (Public Domain)

World War I orders of battle
History of the Serbian Army